Shams al-Din Muhammad Tabadkani (died 1486) was an important Sufi master.

References

Sufis
1486 deaths

Year of birth unknown
Date of birth unknown